Mioče may refer to:
 Mioče (Rudo), a village in Rudo, Bosnia and Herzegovina
 Mioče, Bijelo Polje, Montenegro